Rancho Ciénega de los Paicines was a  Mexican land grant in present day San Benito County, California given in 1842 by Governor Juan B. Alvarado  to Ángel María Castro and José Antonio Rodríguez.  The name means "marsh lands of the Paicines" in Spanish. The grant extended along the San Benito River with Tres Pinos Creek on the east and the Cienega Valley on the west, and encompassed present day Paicines.

History
The two square league Rancho Ciénega de los Paicines grant was given to Angel María Castro and his son-in-law José Antonio Rodriguez.  Angel María Dolores Castro (1794–??), son of  Josef Macario Castro, was a soldier at San Jose and Branciforte and married María Ysabel Butron (daughter of Manuel Josef Butron and Maria Ygnacia Emigdia Higuera)(1796–1848) in 1812.  José Antonio Rodriguez (–1853), son of Sebastian Rodriguez (grantee of Rancho Bolsa del Pajaro) and Maria Pacheco, was a guard at Mission San Miguel and married Hilaria (Elisaria) Castro (1817–), the daughter of Angel Delores Castro and Maria Ysabel Butron 1835.

With the cession of California to the United States following the Mexican-American War, the 1848 Treaty of Guadalupe Hidalgo provided that the land grants would be honored.  As required by the Land Act of 1851, a claim for Rancho Ciénega de los Paicines was filed with the Public Land Commission in 1853, and the grant was patented to Ángel María Castro and José Antonio Rodríguez in 1869.

In 1867 Francisco Villegas sold the rancho to Alexander B. Grogan (-1886), a San Francisco land speculator and financier. Grogan had been Faxon Atherton's California business agent and later the executor of Atherton's estate.  At one time nearby Paicines was named Groganville.  In 1906, the ranch was purchased by A. Kingsley Macomber.

See also
Ranchos of California
List of Ranchos of California
Paicines Ranch

References

Cienega de los Paicines
Cienega de los Paicines